

Robert Meißner (23 December 1888 – 8 August 1953) was an Austrian general in the armed forces of Nazi Germany during World War II. He was a recipient of the Knight's Cross of the Iron Cross.

Awards and decorations

 Knight's Cross of the Iron Cross on 24 May 1943 as Generalleutnant and commander of 68. Infanterie-Division

References

Citations

Bibliography

 

1888 births
1953 deaths
Lieutenant generals of the German Army (Wehrmacht)
Military personnel from Vienna
Austro-Hungarian military personnel of World War I
Austrian military personnel of World War II
Recipients of the Knight's Cross of the Iron Cross
World War II prisoners of war held by the Soviet Union
Austrian prisoners of war
Austrian people who died in Soviet detention
People who died in the Gulag
Austro-Hungarian Army officers